Paulien van Dooremalen (born 4 July 1985) is a Dutch former badminton player and also played for the Amersfoort club. She currently resides in Arnhem and was a doubles specialist. She also featured in the Netherlands women's team that won the 2006 European Women's Team Championships, and also the silver medal at the world women's team championships, 2006 Uber Cup in Japan.

Personal life 
She is the daughter of the former Netherlands national badminton coach and director Martijn van Dooremalen.

Achievements

BWF Grand Prix 
The BWF Grand Prix had two levels, the Grand Prix and Grand Prix Gold. It was a series of badminton tournaments sanctioned by the Badminton World Federation (BWF) and played between 2007 and 2017.

Women's doubles

Mixed doubles

  BWF Grand Prix Gold tournament
  BWF Grand Prix tournament

BWF International Challenge/Series/European Circuit 
Women's doubles

Mixed doubles

  BWF International Challenge tournament
  BWF International Series/ European Circuit tournament

References

External links 
 
 Official website

1985 births
Living people
Sportspeople from Deventer
Dutch female badminton players
21st-century Dutch women